Anthony Macias (born February 9, 1971) is an American mixed martial artist, who last competed in the middleweight division. Macias was introduced to MMA in a fight against Dan Severn at UFC 4, which Macias lost by submission. His nickname, "Mad Dog", comes from his vicious style in the way he fights, reflected by the fact that only three of his 42 fights ended via decision.

He has fought for many top MMA organizations such as UFC and Pride. In the various organizations, he would fight the best in the world, but would often come up short in the fight. Macias' most notable wins came against former UFC fighters Brian Gassaway and Shonie Carter.

Mixed martial arts record

|-
| Loss
| align=center| 26–18
| Zac Kelley
| TKO (punches)
| Oklahoma Fighting Championship 1
| 
| align=center| 1
| align=center| 0:24
| Oklahoma City, Oklahoma, United States
|
|-
| Loss
| align=center| 26–17
| Kemmyelle Haley
| Submission (armbar)
| SCS 21: No Surrender
| 
| align=center| 1
| align=center| 1:17
| Hinton, Oklahoma, United States
|
|-
| Loss
| align=center| 26–16
| Roy Spoon
| TKO (punches)
| Back Alley Promotions
| 
| align=center| 2
| align=center| 3:26
| Arlington, Texas, United States
| 
|-
| Loss
| align=center| 26–15
| Mike Budnik
| Submission (choke)
| C3 Fights: Knockout-Rockout Weekend 4
| 
| align=center| 2
| align=center| 1:30
| Clinton, Oklahoma, United States
| 
|-
| Win
| align=center| 26–14
| Edwynn Jones
| Submission (guillotine choke)
| Xtreme Knockout 7
| 
| align=center| 1
| align=center| 2:07
| Arlington, Texas, United States
| 
|-
| Loss
| align=center| 25–14
| Marcus Hicks
| Submission (armbar)
| Supreme Warrior Championship 10: Art of War
| 
| align=center| 1
| align=center| 1:45
| Frisco, Texas, United States
| 
|-
| Loss
| align=center| 25–13
| Ryan Larson
| Submission (rear-naked choke)
| KOK 8: The Uprising
| 
| align=center| 1
| align=center| 3:28
| Austin, Texas, United States
| 
|-
| Loss
| align=center| 25–12
| Daniel Roberts
| TKO (submission to punches)
| 5150 Combat League/XFL: New Year's Revolution
| 
| align=center| 1
| align=center| 4:00
| Tulsa, Oklahoma, United States
| 
|-
| Win
| align=center| 25–11
| Shonie Carter
| Decision (unanimous)
| Freestyle Cage Fighting 37
| 
| align=center| 3
| align=center| 5:00
| Tulsa, Oklahoma, United States
| 
|-
| Win
| align=center| 24–11
| Chris Zelinsky
| Submission
| World Extreme Fighting: Enid
| 
| align=center| 1
| align=center| 0:47
| Enid, Oklahoma, United States
| 
|-
| Loss
| align=center| 23–11
| Josh Neer
| TKO (punches)
| FFC 11: Explosion
| 
| align=center| 1
| align=center| 0:41
| Biloxi, Mississippi, United States
| 
|-
| Win
| align=center| 23–10
| Kevin Gittemeir
| Submission (toe hold)
| ISCF: Friday Night Fight
| 
| align=center| 1
| align=center| N/A
| Atlanta, Georgia, United States
| 
|-
| Loss
| align=center| 22–10
| Joe Doerksen
| TKO (punches)
| Freestyle Fighting Championships 5
| 
| align=center| 1
| align=center| 3:10
| Biloxi, Mississippi, United States
| 
|-
| Win
| align=center| 22–9
| Luis Morales
| Submission (kneebar)
| World Fighting Championships 2
| 
| align=center| 1
| align=center| N/A
| El Paso, Texas, United States
| 
|-
| Win
| align=center| 21–9
| Frank Alcala
| Submission (heel hook)
| World Fighting Championships 1
| 
| align=center| 1
| align=center| N/A
| San Antonio, Texas, United States
| 
|-
| Win
| align=center| 20–9
| Chad Cook
| Submission (armbar)
| Reality Combat Fighting 15
| 
| align=center| 1
| align=center| 0:39
| N/A
| 
|-
| Loss
| align=center| 19–9
| Eiji Mitsuoka
| Decision (unanimous)
| PRIDE The Best Vol.1
| 
| align=center| 2
| align=center| 5:00
| Tokyo, Japan
| 
|-
| Win
| align=center| 19–8
| Anthony Barbier
| Submission (guillotine choke)
| Freestyle Fighting Championships 1
| 
| align=center| 1
| align=center| N/A
| Biloxi, Mississippi, United States
| 
|-
| Win
| align=center| 18–8
| Hector Garza
| Submission (heel hook)
| Renegades Extreme Fighting
| 
| align=center| 1
| align=center| 1:20
| Texas, United States
| 
|-
| Loss
| align=center| 17–8
| Jesse Jones
| Submission (rear-naked choke)
| Extreme Challenge 44
| 
| align=center| 1
| align=center| 2:23
| Lake Charles, Louisiana, United States
| 
|-
| Loss
| align=center| 17–7
| Steve Heath
| TKO (injury)
| International Fighting Championships Warriors Challenge 6
| 
| align=center| 1
| align=center| 4:10
| Friant, California, United States
| 
|-
| Win
| align=center| 17–6
| Tony Ross
| TKO (cut)
| TFC 1: Fightzone
| 
| align=center| N/A
| align=center| N/A
| Fort Wayne, Indiana, United States
| 
|-
| Win
| align=center| 16–6
| Cedric Marks
| Submission (rear-naked choke)
| World Class Shootfighting
| 
| align=center| 1
| align=center| N/A
| McKinney, Texas, United States
| 
|-
| Loss
| align=center| 15–6
| Kazushi Sakuraba
| Submission (armbar)
| PRIDE 7
| 
| align=center| 2
| align=center| 2:30
| Yokohama, Japan
| 
|-
| Win
| align=center| 15–5
| Cedric Marks
| Submission (guillotine choke)
| Power Ring Warriors
| 
| align=center| 1
| align=center| 4:42
| N/A
| 
|-
| Loss
| align=center| 14–5
| Vladimir Matyushenko
| TKO (doctor stoppage)
| International Fighting Championships 7: Cage Combat
| 
| align=center| 1
| align=center| 0:16
| Kahnawake, Canada
| 
|-
| Loss
| align=center| 14–4
| Vladimir Matyushenko
| TKO (submission to punches)
| International Fighting Championships 5: Battle in the Bayou
| 
| align=center| 1
| align=center| 2:59
| Baton Rouge, Louisiana, United States
| 
|-
| Win
| align=center| 14–3
| Wes Gassaway
| TKO (submission to punches)
| International Fighting Championships 5: Battle in the Bayou
| 
| align=center| 1
| align=center| 3:49
| Baton Rouge, Louisiana, United States
| 
|-
| Win
| align=center| 13–3
| Yvonne Labbe
| Submission (rear-naked choke)
| International Fighting Championships 5: Battle in the Bayou
| 
| align=center| 1
| align=center| 0:38
| Baton Rouge, Louisiana, United States
| 
|-
| Win
| align=center| 12–3
| Paul Kimbro
| N/A
| World Fighting Council
| 
| align=center| N/A
| align=center| N/A
| N/A
| 
|-
| Win
| align=center| 11–3
| Courtney Ortega
| N/A
| World Fighting Council
| 
| align=center| N/A
| align=center| N/A
| N/A
| 
|-
| Loss
| align=center| 10–3
| Allan Goes
| TKO (submission to punches)
| Extreme Fighting 3
| 
| align=center| 1
| align=center| 3:52
| Tulsa, Oklahoma, United States
| 
|-
| Win
| align=center| 10–2
| Brian Gassaway
| Submission (kneebar)
| International Fighting Championships 2: Mayhem in Mississippi
| 
| align=center| 1
| align=center| 1:28
| Biloxi, Mississippi, United States
| Won IFC 2 Tournament
|-
| Win
| align=center| 9–2
| Houston Dorr
| Submission (armbar)
| International Fighting Championships 2: Mayhem in Mississippi
| 
| align=center| 1
| align=center| 0:17
| Biloxi, Mississippi, United States
| 
|-
| Win
| align=center| 8–2
| Gene Lydick
| TKO (doctor)
| International Fighting Championships 2: Mayhem in Mississippi
| 
| align=center| 1
| align=center| 1:13
| Biloxi, Mississippi, United States
| 
|-
| Win
| align=center| 7–2
| James Minson
| Submission (guillotine choke)
| Oklahoma Free Fight Federation 2
| 
| align=center| 1
| align=center| N/A
| Enid, Oklahoma, United States
| Won OFFF 2 Tournament
|-
| Win
| align=center| 6–2
| Ron Goins
| KO
| Oklahoma Free Fight Federation 2
| 
| align=center| 2
| align=center| N/A
| Enid, Oklahoma, United States
| 
|-
| Win
| align=center| 5–2
| William Diaz
| Submission (heel hook)
| Oklahoma Free Fight Federation 2
| 
| align=center| 1
| align=center| N/A
| Enid, Oklahoma, United States
| 
|-
| Win
| align=center| 4–2
| Jason Nicholsen
| N/A
| Oklahoma Free Fight Federation 1
| 
| align=center| 1
| align=center| 0:57
| Tulsa, Oklahoma, United States
| Won OFFF 1 Tournament
|-
| Win
| align=center| 3–2
| John Dixson
| Decision
| Oklahoma Free Fight Federation 1
| 
| align=center| 3
| align=center| 3:00
| Tulsa, Oklahoma, United States
| 
|-
| Win
| align=center| 2–2
| Jim Mullen
| Submission (guillotine choke)
| Oklahoma Free Fight Federation 1
| 
| align=center| 1
| align=center| 1:54
| Tulsa, Oklahoma, United States
| 
|-
| Loss
| align=center| 1–2
| Oleg Taktarov
| Submission (guillotine choke)
| UFC 6
| 
| align=center| 1
| align=center| 0:09
| Casper, Wyoming, United States
| 
|-
| Win
| align=center| 1–1
| He-Man Ali Gipson
| TKO (submission to punches)
| UFC 6
| 
| align=center| 1
| align=center| 3:06
| Casper, Wyoming, United States
| 
|-
| Loss
| align=center| 0–1
| Dan Severn
| Submission (rear naked choke)
| UFC 4
| 
| align=center| 1
| align=center| 1:45
| Tulsa, Oklahoma, United States
|

References

External links
 
 
 Archived MMA Universe Fighter Record

1971 births
American male mixed martial artists
Mixed martial artists from Oklahoma
Welterweight mixed martial artists
Middleweight mixed martial artists
Mixed martial artists utilizing taekwondo
Mixed martial artists utilizing karate
Mixed martial artists utilizing Muay Thai
Mixed martial artists utilizing sambo
Mixed martial artists utilizing wrestling
Mixed martial artists utilizing judo
Mixed martial artists utilizing jujutsu
Ultimate Fighting Championship male fighters
American male taekwondo practitioners
American male karateka
American Muay Thai practitioners
American sambo practitioners
American male judoka
American jujutsuka
Living people